Gradation may refer to:

 Gradation (music), gradual change within one parameter or an overlapping of two blocks of a wavelength.
 Gradation (album), 1988 pop album by Shizuka Kudo
 Gradation (art), visual technique of gradually transitioning from one colour or texture to another
 Consonant gradation, mutation in which consonant sounds alternate between various "grades"
 Apophony or vowel gradation, sound change within a word that indicates grammatical information
 Calibration, comparison of measurement values of a device with a standard of known accuracy
 Production of a graded algebra

See also
 Color grading, process of altering and enhancing the color of an image
 Comparison (grammar), a feature whereby adjectives or adverbs indicate relative degree
 Evaluation, systematic determination of a subject's merit, worth and significance
 Grade (disambiguation)
 Gradient (disambiguation)
 Degradation (disambiguation)